Kel Robertson is an Australian crime novelist who was born in the 1950s on the south coast of New South Wales. His novel Smoke & Mirrors shared the 2009 Ned Kelly Award for Best Novel, with Deep Water by Peter Corris.

Robertson lived in Sydney and various New South Wales country towns before entering high school in Bathurst. He has studied at a number of tertiary institutions and lives in Canberra.

He is the author of three novels featuring the Chinese-Australian Federal Police investigator, Brad Chen.</ref> Austlit - Kel Robertson</ref> He is currently, in 2021, working on a fourth Chen book.

Novels
 Dead Set (2006)
 Smoke and Mirrors (2008)
 Rip Off (2011)
 Dare to Think (2019): a dystopian crime novel featuring the Cornwall Police Inspector, Melissa Raeburn.

Awards
 2006 shortlisted Ned Kelly Awards — Best First Novel for Dead Set
 2009 winner Ned Kelly Awards — Best Novel for Smoke and Mirrors
 2009 winner ACT Writers Centre's Literary Awards — Fiction for Smoke and Mirrors
 2009 winner Canberra Critics Circle Awards — Writing for Smoke and Mirrors

References

Living people
Australian male novelists
Ned Kelly Award winners
Australian crime writers
Year of birth missing (living people)